The 2005 Strauss Canada Cup of Curling was held March 15–20, 2005, at Sport Mart Place in Kamloops, British Columbia. The winning teams received berths into the 2005 Canadian Olympic Curling Trials.

Future Olympic champion Kevin Martin won the men's event, while 2006 Olympic bronze medalist Shannon Kleibrink won the women's event, which aided her path to reach the Olympics. She had already qualified for the Trials, so the runner-up Jan Betker rink earned a berth.

The total purse for the event was $180,000. Martin's team won $37,750, while Team Kleibrink took home $37,250.

While it was the third edition of the Canada Cup, the 2005 event was the first to be a part of Curling Canada's Season of Champions programme.

Men's event

Teams

Preliminary round

Tiebreaker
 Burtnyk 7, Morris 6

Playoffs

Women's event

Teams

Preliminary round

Tie breaker
 Kleibrink 8, Jones 1

Playoffs

References

 
 
 
 
 2018 Home Hardware Canada Cup Media Guide: 2005 Strauss Canada Cup

External links
 Archived Official Website

2005 in British Columbia
Canada Cup (curling)
Sport in Kamloops
2005 in Canadian curling
Curling competitions in British Columbia
March 2005 sports events in Canada